The Hsiung Feng II (HF-2; , "Brave Wind II") is an anti-ship missile system developed by the National Chung-Shan Institute of Science and Technology (NCSIST) in Taiwan. The HF-2 is designed to be deployed aboard ships or at facilities on land. An airborne version has also been developed which can be carried by the ROC Air Force's F-CK fighters. The HF-2 has ECCM capabilities and is deployed on the ROC Navy's  and  frigates, as well as at several land-based sites. In 2000, plans were announced to replace the HF-2 missiles stationed on the Cheng Kung frigates with the RGM-84 Harpoon, but the budget for this was cancelled.

Versions 

There are three major versions of HF-2 in service.  he first to enter service is the ship-based HF-2, with 2 twin box launcher on destroyer DD-915 first as a trial vessel.  Later all major surface combatant in RoCN, except the Knox, were equipped with 2 quad-launchers, plus the 7 World War II-era  guided missile destroyers that was upgraded to WC3 standard, from the late 1980s to mid-1990s, had added a 1 quad-launcher by mid-1990s to give those air defense ships an anti-surface ability.

An air-launched version appeared in the early 1990s. Carried by two AT-3B trainer/attacker and a single A-3 attacker, the small force poses little threat to the marine intruders due to its small quantity. However, the recent upgraded IDF (F-CK-1C/D) will add the capacity to carry and launch the HF-2, thus greatly enhance the air-to-surface capacity of RoCAF in future. The air launcher version of HF-2 carried by AT-3 is different from the one supposed carried by original IDF (F-CK-1A/B) prototype, due to differences in length of the HF-2 missile (better known as HF-2 Mark 3 and Mark 4), where the rocket designed for one aircraft cannot fit on another aircraft. Unknown if air-launched HF-2 program is continuing at this point.

The land-launch version of the HF-2 is the most secretive one because of its relation with the land-attack version of HF-2E. Fixed base versions were produced first, and all major outlying islands of Taiwan were equipped with fortified HF-2 bases in the late 1990s, replacing old HF-1 bases.  Fixed HF-1 bases in the main island were also being replaced with fixed HF-2 launchers, again in fortified positions.

The mobile launcher version was accepted in 2005 and went to mass production in 2006.  All mobile launchers, together with mobile command center (with data-link), mobile surface search radar and portable electric generators, were kept in harden shelters and being driven out when needed. The HF-2 mobile launchers, shown in 10 October 2007 parade, was designed to be able to carry both HF-2 and the new HF-3 AShM, by leaving room for the larger HF-3 missile boxes. Same was done to the /'s new HF-2 launchers after each frigate's major overhaul, starting 2001, that allows the launcher to carry larger HF-3 AShM, besides HF-2. The s (total 12 built) also are undergoing the same upgrade to carry two twin-mounted HF-2/3 anti-ship missiles. The s (total 31 built) carry two twin-mounted HF-2 anti-ship missiles. The s also carry four quad-mounted HF-2/HF-3 anti-ship missiles.

A submarine-launched version was planned and designed in the mid-1990s, but nothing more was heard.

Block II 

In 2019 mass production of an improved Block IIB was approved with production to be completed by 2023.

Future development

HF-2B
In November 2019 NCSIST tested a new short range anti-ship missile which while weighting significantly less than the Hsiung Feng II is said to have the same range. The test was conducted using NCSIST’s Glorious Star test ship. The provisional designation is HF-2B and production is scheduled to begin in 2021. The reported range of the HF-2B is 250km.

General characteristics 
 Primary function: Anti-ship missile, some prototypes land attack cruise missiles
 Power plant: Solid propellant booster, turbojet in-flight
 Range:  (antiship)
 Top speed: 
 Weight: 
 Length: 
 Diameter: 
 Guidance: Inertial guidance midflight, terminal with dual active radar homing and infrared homing seekers
 Date deployed: Early 1990s

Popular culture 
In 2019 Sputnik News and other began propagating a conspiracy theory that the Argentinian submarine  had been sunk by a Taiwanese HF-2 anti-ship missile used by international mercenaries working for multinational oil companies.

See also 
 Hsiung Feng I
 Hsiung Feng IIE
 Hsiung Feng III
 YJ-83
 C-802

References

External links 
 Manufacturer's video: 
 Taiwan primer
 GlobalSecurity article on the HF-2

Anti-ship cruise missiles of the Republic of China
Military equipment introduced in the 1990s